Omar Khayyam (1048-1131) was a Persian poet, mathematician, philosopher and astronomer.

Khayyam may also refer to:

Places
 Khayyam, Nishapur, a village and site of the 2004 Nishapur train disaster
 Khayyam, Kermanshah, a former village, now borough of the city of Kermanshah
 Khayam Metro Station, a station on the Tehran Metro Line at Khayam Street
 Khayyam Expressway, an expressway in Esfahan
 Omar Khayyam Square, a city square in Nishapur

People with the surname
 Mohammed Zahur Khayyam (1927–2019), commonly credited as 'Khayyam', Indian music composer
 Amina Khayyam (born 1980), British dancer
 Omar Khayam (protester) (born 1983), British protester who dressed as a suicide bomber

People with the given name
 Khayyam Mirzazade (born 1935), Azerbaijani composer and professor

See also
 Khayyam triangle
 Khayyam quadrilateral
 Kerry Wendell Thornley (1938–1998), co-founder of Discordianism, who wrote as Omar Khayyam Ravenhurst
 Omar Khayyam (disambiguation)